The Oxis Chinese Character Finder is an online tool (and method) for entering  Chinese characters.

A set of twenty-four abstract graphics is used to describe the printed form of Chinese characters. Each graphic is represented by a single ascii digit or letter, and the graphics themselves can be approximated with Chinese characters. The characters and their text equivalents are:

目1 日2  罒3 夕4 口5  乂6  牛7  十8  ノ9  八A  阝B  丶D  山E  一H  丨I  亅J  长K  乚L  弓S  厂T  冂U  ㄥV  人Y  フZ

These are combined according to a small set of rules that can be used implicitly or shown explicitly. The main rules are: 

 combine as a sequence, q; 
 combine as a superposition, p; 
 use as an influence, n.

White space is designated by an underscore or a hyphen, and brackets can be used to disambiguate certain combinations. A complete character is represented by a string of ascii text.

The oxis schema is used as an input system for Chinese characters by entering part or parts of a character (optionally as a mixture of oxis text, oxis graphics, and constituent Chinese characters) to invoke all the characters in a particular set that contain these graphics in this order. The set searched can be restricted in several specific ways, for example by entering an R to find radicals only.  This is currently implemented for the first 2000 Chinese characters (simplified and traditional) plus radicals in a website designed for users with slight to moderate familiarity with Chinese. It also lets users create their own searchable subsets.

See also
 Chinese input methods for computers

External links 
Information
  Oxis Chinese Character Finder

Han character input
Index (publishing)